The Jewish Cemetery on the Mount of Olives is the oldest and most important Jewish cemetery in Jerusalem. It is approximately five centuries old, having been first leased from the Jerusalem Islamic Waqf in the sixteenth century. The cemetery contains anywhere between 70,000 and 150,000 tombs, including the tombs of famous figures in early modern Jewish history. It is considered to be the largest and holiest Jewish cemetery on earth.

It is adjacent to the much older archaeological site known as the Silwan necropolis.

History

19th century – 1948
In the 19th century, special significance was attached to Jewish cemeteries in Jerusalem, since they were the last meeting place not only of Jerusalemites but also of Jews from all over the world. Over the years, many Jews in their old age came to Jerusalem in order to live out the rest of their lives there and to be buried in its holy soil. The desire to be buried on the Mount of Olives stemmed in part from the Segulaic advantages attributed to the burial, according to various sources.

During the First and Second Temple Periods, the Jews of Jerusalem were buried in burial caves scattered on the slopes of the Mount, and from the 16th century the cemetery began to take its present shape.

The old Jewish cemetery sprawled over the slopes of the Mount of Olives overlooking the Kidron Valley (Valley of Jehoshaphat), radiating out from the lower, ancient part, which preserved Jewish graves from the Second Temple period; here there had been a tradition of burial uninterrupted for thousands of years. The cemetery was quite close to the Old City, its chief merit being that it lay just across the Kidron Valley from the Temple Mount: according to a midrash, it is here that the Resurrection of the Dead would begin. The Messiah will appear on the Mount of Olives, and head toward the Temple Mount. As the sages say: "In the days to come, the righteous will appear and rise in Jerusalem, as it is said, "And they will sprout out of the city like the grass of the field" – and there is no city but Jerusalem".

Jordanian rule
During the Jordanian rule, the Jewish cemetery suffered damage to gravestones and tombs.

Between 1949 and 1967, Israel accused the Jordanians of not protecting the site. As early as the end of 1949, Israeli viewers stationed on Mount Zion reported that Arab residents had been uprooting some tombstones. In 1954, the Israeli government filed a formal complaint with the UN General Assembly regarding the further destruction of graves and plowing in the area. Israel also stated that in the late 1950s the Jordanian army used tombstones to build a military camp in nearby al-Eizariya to floor tents and toilets, and that some tombstones were transferred to the courtyard of the Citadel of David, where they were smashed and fragments of which were used as markers for the parade ground. Israel also claimed that when new roads were built – one to the new Hotel Inter-Continental Jerusalem ("Seven Arches") on top of the Mount of Olives, one extending the road to Jericho, and one expanding the access road to the village of Silwan – numerous graves were destroyed in the process.

Shortly after 1967, these claims escalated into a war of words between Zerah Warhaftig, the Israeli Minister of Religious Affairs, and the Franciscan priest and Custodian of the Holy Land Father Isaias Andrès.

Israeli rule

In 1992, with the burial of Prime Minister Menachem Begin on the Mount of Olives, it was decided to establish a dedicated security company for the cemetery, and to increase the protection of visitors to the site. In 2005, acts of harassment against Jews intensified, and a guard unit was created for personal or group escort to those who came to the cemetery. In 2009, cars were attacked and many visitors were injured on the way to the cemetery. The "Jerusalem for generations" association turned to public figures, followed by a debate in the Knesset. In 2011, the chairman of the Almagor organization (terror victims association) was attacked and injured on his way to the graves of his Holocaust survivor parents. As a result, an attempt was made to increase public awareness of this attack and to mobilize the authorities and voluntary organizations against it. As of 2010, the security and personal escort service is free of charge, financed by the Ministry of Housing. Till today, burial plots and tombs remain in a state of neglect. The plots of the graves suffer from vandalism, including the desecration of gravestones and the destruction of graves. A series of government decisions to rehabilitate parts of the mountain, as well as funds allocated for maintenance and renovation, have not yet succeeded in changing the situation.

Notable graves

Many famous names are buried in the cemetery such as Rabbi Chaim ibn Attar, known as the Ohr ha-Chaim, and Rabbi Yehuda Alcalay who were among the heralds of Zionism; Hasidic rebbes of various dynasties and Rabbis of "Yishuv haYashan" (the old – pre-Zionist – Jewish settlement) together with  Rabbi Avraham Yitzchak Kook, the first Ashkenazi Chief Rabbi, and his circle; Henrietta Szold, the founder of the Hadassah organization; the poet Else Lasker-Schüler, Eliezer Ben-Yehuda, the father of Modern Hebrew, Shmuel Yosef Agnon, the Nobel Laureate for Literature, and Boris Schatz, the founder of the Bezalel School of Art; Israel's sixth Prime Minister Menachem Begin; the victims of the 1929 Arab riots and 1936–39 Arab revolt, the fallen from the 1948 Arab–Israeli War, together with Jews of many generations in their diversity.

Rabbis and religious scholars

Early modern period

Obadiah ben Abraham, the Bartenura (c. 1445 – c. 1515)
Meir ben Judah Leib Poppers, Bohemian rabbi and kabbalist (c. 1624–1662)
Judah he-Hasid (1660–1700), 17th-century immigration leader
Ḥayyim ben Moshe ibn Attar, the Ohr ha-Ḥayyim (–1743)
Abraham Gershon of Kitov (1701–1761), brother-in-law of the Baal Shem Tov
Shalom Sharabi, the Rashash (1720–1777)
Zundel Salant (1786–1866), rabbi and primary teacher of Rabbi Yisrael Salanter

Late 19th century onwards
Elazar Abuchatzeira, rabbi and grandson of the Baba Sali
Levi Yitzchok Bender, leader of the Breslov community in Uman and Jerusalem
Avrohom Blumenkrantz, American Orthodox rabbi
David Cohen (rabbi), the "Rav Ha-Nazir"
Yehoshua Leib Diskin, rabbi in Brest (Belarus) and Jerusalem
Shlomo Elyashiv, Lithuanian kabbalist
Moshe Mordechai Epstein, rosh yeshivas Slabodka, Lithuania
Nosson Tzvi Finkel, the Alter of Slabodka
Zerah Flegeltaub, rabbi of Jerusalem and Suwałki, Poland, son of Rabbi Shlomo Flegeltaub of Warsaw
Yitzchok Dovid Groner, director of Yeshivah Centre, Melbourne, Melbourne, Australia
Shimon Hakham, Bukharian writer and translator of Jewish holy texts and stories in Judeo-Tajik
Moshe Halberstam, rosh yeshivas Tschakava
Yosef Hayyim, Baghdad-born rabbi and posek known as the Ben-Ish Hai (disputed)
Yitzchok Hutner, rosh yeshivas Yeshiva Rabbi Chaim Berlin, Brooklyn, New York
Aryeh Kaplan, American Orthodox rabbi and author
Abraham Isaac Kook (1865–1935)  first to hold Ashkenazi Chief Rabbinate of Israel position under British Mandatory Palestine. One of the fathers of Religious Zionism who founded Mercaz HaRav in 1924.
Zvi Yehuda Kook, Rosh Yeshiva Mercaz HaRav Kook and son of Rav Abraham Isaac Kook
Elyah Lopian, prominent rabbi of the Musar movement
Avigdor Miller, American Orthodox rabbi, author and lecturer
Shlomo Moussaieff, Bukharian family patriarch
Yaakov Mutzafi, head of the Sephardi Edah HaHaredith, Jerusalem
Eliyahu David Rabinowitz-Teomim, rosh yeshivas Mir
Yechezkel Sarna, rosh yeshivas Slabodka
Chaim Pinchas Scheinberg, rabbi and Rosh Yeshiva of Torah Ore
Gedalia Schorr, rabbi and Rosh Yeshiva of Torah Vodaas, Brooklyn, New York
Sholom Schwadron, the "Maggid of Jerusalem"
Dov Schwartzman, rosh yeshiva Yeshivas Bais HaTalmud, Jerusalem
Avraham Shapira, rosh yeshivas Mercaz HaRav Kook
Gedaliah Silverstone, rabbi in Belfast and Washington, D.C. 
Yaakov Chaim Sofer, the Kaf Hachaim

Ahron Soloveichik, rosh yeshivas Brisk, Chicago, Illinois

Pesach Stein, rosh yeshivas Telz, Cleveland, Ohio
Yitzchok Yaakov Weiss, head of the Edah HaChareidis, Jerusalem

Hasidic Rebbes
Simcha Bunim Alter, fifth Gerrer rebbe
Yisrael Alter, fourth Gerrer rebbe
Moshe Biderman, Lelover rebbe
Mordechai Shlomo Friedman, Boyaner rebbe of New York City
Levi Yitzchak Horowitz, second Bostoner rebbe
Maiden of Ludmir, female Hasidic rebbe
Yechiel Yehoshua Rabinowicz, Biala Rebbe 
 David Matityahu Rabinowicz, the "Laheves David", Biala Rebbe and son of Rebbe Yechiel Yehoshua
Isamar Rosenbaum, Nadvorna rebbe
Shaul Yedidya Elazar Taub, Modzitzer rebbe

Chief Rabbis
Solomon Eliezer Alfandari, Chief Rabbi of Damascus and Safed
Meir Auerbach, first Ashkenazi Chief Rabbi of Jerusalem
Chaim Berlin, Chief Rabbi of Moscow
She'ar Yashuv Cohen, Chief Rabbi of Haifa
Haim Moussa Douek, Chief Rabbi of Egypt
Jacob Saul Elyashar, Sephardic Chief Rabbi of Ottoman Palestine
Shlomo Goren, Ashkenazi Chief Rabbi of Israel
Immanuel Jakobovits, Chief Rabbi of the United Hebrew Congregations of the Commonwealth, London
Abraham Isaac Kook, Chief Rabbi of British Mandate Palestine
Jacob Meir, Sephardic Chief Rabbi of British Mandate Palestine
Meyer Rosenbaum, Chief Rabbi of Cuba
Shmuel Salant, Ashkenazi Chief Rabbi of Jerusalem
Yosef Chaim Sonnenfeld, Chief Rabbi of the Edah HaChareidis, Jerusalem
Isser Yehuda Unterman, Ashkenazi Chief Rabbi of Israel
Shlomo Zev Zweigenhaft, Chief Rabbi of Hanover and Lower Saxony

Businesspeople
Sheldon Adelson, American Jewish businessman, investor, philanthropist and political donor
Harry Fischel, American Jewish businessman and philanthropist
Robert Maxwell, British media magnate, fraudster, and supporter of Israel
George Weidenfeld, British Jewish businessman and philanthropist

Cultural figures
Shmuel Yosef Agnon, Israeli writer
Nissim Behar, pioneer of modern Hebrew education
Shmuel Ben David (1884–1927), illustrator, painter, typographer, and designer
Eliezer Ben-Yehuda, father of modern Hebrew
Jacob Fishman, American Yiddish newspaper editor
Israel Dov Frumkin, Israeli journalist
Uri Zvi Grinberg, Israeli poet and journalist
Yossele Rosenblatt, hazzan and composer
Boris Schatz, founder of the Bezalel School in Jerusalem
Else Lasker-Schüler, German-Jewish poet
Yosef Shenberger, Israeli architect
Ephraim Urbach, Israeli scholar

Political figures
Judah Alkalai (Yehuda Alcalay; 1798–1878), precursor of political Zionism
Moshe Barazani, Lehi fighter
Menachem Begin, Israeli prime minister
Eliyahu Ben-Elissar, Israeli politician and diplomat
Israel Eldad, Revisionist Zionist philosopher and fighter
Meir Feinstein, Irgun fighter
Jacob Israël de Haan, Dutch Jewish journalist assassinated by the Haganah
Zevulun Hammer, Israeli politician, minister and deputy prime minister
Moshe Hirsch, rabbi, leader of Neturei Karta, anti-Zionist militant
Ida Silverman, Jewish philanthropist, speaker, and Zionist fund-raiser
Henrietta Szold, founder of Hadassah, the Women's Zionist Organization of America
Dawid Wdowiński Founder of the ZZW

Figures from science
Israel Jacob Kligler, microbiologist, main actor in the eradication of malaria in Mandatory Palestine
Jacob Lahijani, scientist and inventor

Terror victims
Eliyahu Asheri, Israeli terror victim
Gavriel and Rivka Holtzberg, terror victims
Rachel, Netanel, Rephael and Ephraim Weiss, victims of the Jericho bus firebombing
Abraham Zelmanowitz, American victim of the September 11 attacks

References

External links

 Official website
 

Mount of Olives
Jewish cemeteries in Jerusalem
Jewish pilgrimage sites
Cemetery vandalism and desecration